is a Japanese politician.

He was born in Kyoto to a family of textile wholesalers who had operated the business since the Edo period.  He graduated with a BA from Kyoto University's economics department in 1960.  At Kyoto University he was a member of the tennis club.  Upon graduation Ibuki became a bureaucrat at the Ministry of Finance.  He was dispatched to the Japanese embassy in London in 1965, where he stayed for four years.

Ibuki entered politics in 1983 at former Finance Minister Michio Watanabe's behest. He is a member of the Liberal Democratic Party (LDP) and has served in a variety of government positions, including Minister of Labour (1997~98) and National Public Safety Commission chairman (2000~01).

He was appointed Minister of Education, Culture, Sports, Science, and Technology on 26 September 2006 as a part of Prime Minister Shinzō Abe's first cabinet. In this position, he promoted the controversial revision of the Fundamental Law of Education.  He was subsequently appointed as Secretary-General of the LDP in September 2007; less than a year later, he was replaced in that position by Taro Aso and was instead appointed as Minister of Finance.  He is known for his knowledge of finance and tax and welfare policies. He held the post of Finance Minister for less than two months, however, and was replaced by Shōichi Nakagawa in the Cabinet of Prime Minister Taro Aso, appointed on 24 September 2008.

On 26 December 2012, Bunmei Ibuki was elected Speaker of the House of Representatives of Japan. He presided over the day of his inauguration, the election of Prime Minister Shinzō Abe.

Personal life

 Ibuki is a fluent English speaker and a believer of Tenrikyo. He is a member of the openly revisionist lobby Nippon Kaigi, and affiliated to the fundamentalist shinto lobby Shinto Seiji Renmei Kokkai Giin Kondankai (神道政治連盟国会議員懇談会).
 Ibuki is nicknamed "Ibu-King" due to his enduring political influence despite his now-advanced age.

Honours
 : Knight Grand Cross of the Order of Orange-Nassau (29 October 2014)

References

External links
 Discussions on Japanese politics and education (Streaming and mp3)

1938 births
Living people
21st-century Japanese politicians
Culture ministers of Japan
Education ministers of Japan
Government ministers of Japan
Ministers of Finance of Japan
Japanese Shintoists
Kyoto University alumni
Labor ministers of Japan
Liberal Democratic Party (Japan) politicians
Members of Nippon Kaigi
People from Kyoto
Politicians from Kyoto Prefecture
Science ministers of Japan
Speakers of the House of Representatives (Japan)
Sports ministers of Japan
Technology ministers of Japan
Tenrikyo